Chiyah is situated in the west region of the Lebanese capital of Beirut and is part of Greater Beirut.

Location
Chiyah is located in the southwest suburbs of the capital Beirut, bordered by Haret Hreik, Ghobeiry, Hadath, Hazmiyeh, Furn-el-chebbak and Ain El Remmaneh. However, before 1956, it used to cover a larger area that included the current districts of Karm el Zeitoun, Hayy el Knissé, Bir Abed and Haret el Mjadlé, as well as Jnah, Ghobeiry, Furn-el-chebbak, Bir Hassan and Ain El Remanneh.

The meaning of its name is vague, and many suppositions were found, with one saying that it means the processing of metal (Shewah). Another theory is the Arabic origin of the name means a kind of tree that is used for silk production (a flourishing industry in this former village). The city was once covered with citrus orchards and extending to the Mediterranean Sea. Today, it is a full part of the demographically huge Beirut outskirts totalling around 60,000 inhabitants.

Demographics
Prior the 1960s, Chiyah was a predominantly Christian town with a significant local Shiite minority, but the towns' Shia Muslim population soon swelled due to migration. The major surnames or families in Chiyah are Kanj, Rahme, Mahmoud, Nasr, Srouji, Maarouf, Kassem, Farraj, Sous, and El-Khatib.

History
Prior the 1860 civil war, Chiyah was largely inhabited by Shia Muslims, but many Christians refugees settled in the town following the chaos which ensued.

In May 1988 following three weeks of intense fighting between Amal and Hizbullah, Ghobeiry and Chiyah were the only districts of Beirut that Amal was able to retain control of, the rest of Southern Beirut coming under Hizbullah control.

On 21 December 1994 a car bomb in Chyah killed Fuad Mughniyeh, one  brother of Hizbullah commander Imad Mughniyeh. Two other people were killed in the explosion and sixteen wounded.

The current head of the municipality is parliament member hopeful Edmond Gharios. Roland Rahal headed the municipality for the time of the parliamentary elections. Naji Gharios, a native of Chiyah, was elected in June 2009 as member of the Lebanese Parliament representing the Baabda district.

See also
Amal Movement militia
Mountain War (Lebanon)
Lebanese Civil War

External links
Chiyah, Localiban

References

Greater Beirut
Populated places in Baabda District
Maronite Christian communities in Lebanon
Shia Muslim communities in Lebanon